Sir John Saunders Sebright, 7th Baronet,  (23 May 1767 – 15 April 1846), of Besford, Worcestershire, and Beechwood Park, Hertfordshire, was an English politician and agricultural innovator.

Life
Born on 23 May 1767 in Sackville Street, St. James's, he was the eldest son of Sir John Sebright, 6th Baronet, by Sarah, daughter of Edward Knight, of Wolverley, Worcestershire. His father died in March 1794.

The seventh baronet served for a short time in the Foot Guards and was attached to the staff of Lord Amherst. He was elected M.P. for Hertfordshire on 11 May 1807, and continued to represent the county till the end of the first reformed parliament. He was appointed High Sheriff of Hertfordshire for 1797–98. He commanded the Western Battalion, Hertfordshire Local Militia, when it was raised at St Albans in 1808.

Parliamentarian
Sebright disclaimed connection with a party, but generally acted with the more advanced Whigs. He was a strong advocate of economy in administration, of the abolition of sinecures and unnecessary offices, and of the reduction of indirect taxation. He was in principle a free-trader.

On 5 April 1821 he seconded Lord Cranborne's motion for an inquiry into the game laws, and supported subsequent bills for their amendment. In 1826 he attributed the increase of crime chiefly to their influence. In 1824, and again in 1828, he spoke in favour of the repeal of the usury laws, and he 'detested monopolies of all kinds.'

As a practical agriculturist, owning land in three counties, Sebright gave his opinion (17 December 1830) against any allotments larger than kitchen-gardens, but was willing to try an experiment on a larger scale.

When, on 1 March 1831, Lord John Russell moved for leave to bring in the first Reform Bill, Sebright, as an independent member, seconded the motion; and supported this and the succeeding reform bills. On 17 December 1832 he was returned for Hertfordshire, at the head of the poll, to the first reformed parliament, but retired at its close.

Death and legacy
He died on 15 April 1846 at Turnham Green and was buried at Flamstead. A portrait of him was engraved by S. Reynolds from a painting by Boileau. He built and endowed a school at Cheverell's Green, and a row of almshouses for sixteen paupers in the parish of Flamstead, Hertfordshire, where some of the family property lay. The Sebright bantam, which he created, is named after him and remains a popular breed of chicken to this day.

Works
In 1809 he published a letter to Sir Joseph Banks on The Art of Improving the Breeds of Domestic Animals. Sebright was also author of Observations on Hawking, describing the mode of breaking and managing several kinds of hawks used in falconry, 1826; and of Observations upon the Instinct of Animals, 1836. Charles Darwin commented on Sebright's practical skill as a breeder in The Variation of Animals and Plants Under Domestication.

Family
He married, on 6 August 1793, Harriet, heiress of Richard Crofts of West Harling, Norfolk. She died in August 1826, having borne nine children:
Sir Thomas Gage Saunders Sebright, 8th Baronet (1802–1864). He married Lady Sarah Anne Hoffmann (12 September 1809 - 14 February 1846), daughter of Frederick Hoffman, Esq., Capt R.N. (author of "A Sailor of King George: The Journals of Captain Frederick Hoffman, RN, 1793-1814"). Lady Sarah Anne is buried in the English Cemetery, Florence.
Frederica Anne Sebright
Emily Sebright (d. 1822), married Frederick Franks in 1822
Caroline Sebright
Frances Elizabeth Sebright
Sophia Sebright (d. 1829), unmarried
Mary Anne Sebright
Octavia Elinor Sebright
Gertrude Sebright (11 Aug 1807 – 1820)

See also
Sebright (chicken)

References

Notes

Attribution

1767 births
1846 deaths
Agricultural writers
British Army officers
Hertfordshire Militia officers
Sebright, 07th Baronet
Deputy Lieutenants of Hertfordshire
Members of the Parliament of the United Kingdom for Hertfordshire
High Sheriffs of Hertfordshire
UK MPs 1807–1812
UK MPs 1812–1818
UK MPs 1818–1820
UK MPs 1820–1826
UK MPs 1826–1830
UK MPs 1830–1831
UK MPs 1831–1832
UK MPs 1832–1835
People from Wychavon (district)
People from Markyate